Francis Langhorne Dade (1793? – December 28, 1835) was a Brevet Major in the U.S. 4th Infantry Regiment, United States Army, during the Second Seminole War. Dade was killed in a battle with Seminole Indians that came to be known as the "Dade Massacre".

Life and career
Dade was born in Virginia, most likely in King George County. He joined the Twelfth Infantry in March 1813 (during the War of 1812) as a third lieutenant. He was transferred to the Fourth Infantry in May 1815. Under this post, he successfully led two military expeditions, in 1825 and 1826, from Fort Brooke in Tampa to Fort King near Ocala, through an area that was wilderness at the time and in the midst of ongoing conflict with Native Americans. He also commanded the United States Army base at Key West, and was eventually assigned to command the southern portion of Florida, running from Cape Florida on the Atlantic coast to Charlotte Harbor on the Gulf coast. He was brevetted major in February 1828 after ten years of service as a captain. By late 1835, he commanded a unit of 47 men, half of whom were European immigrants. Dade was stationed in Key West until October of 1835, when violence broke out in the Second Seminole War. General Duncan Lamont Clinch ordered Dade to leave one noncommissioned officer and 3 privates in Key West before taking the rest of his men to Fort Brooke.

Dade's final mission was to lead 110 men from Fort Brooke to Fort King. The Seminoles, led by Osceola and Micanopy, destroyed bridges over the Hillsborough River and Withlacoochee River in order to delay the progress of the command, and ambushed the men on December 28, killing Dade and most of his men, and leaving only two survivors. The attack was followed in 1836 by widespread attacks on white settlers in Florida, and then by a US military buildup under General Winfield Scott. Dade and his men were not formally buried until a unit led by Edmund P. Gaines arrived at the site of the massacre in February 1836, Dade's remains only being identifiable by his vest and infantry buttons.

Legacy 

When hostilities ceased, the Army proposed to transfer the remains of all who died in the territory, including those who fell with Dade, to a single burial ground. Reinterment took place at the St. Augustine Post Cemetery, which would become St. Augustine National Cemetery. In addition to Dade's command, more than 1,400 soldiers were interred in three mass graves. These men are memorialized by the Dade Monument, which is composed of three distinct pyramids, constructed of native coquina stone, and an obelisk. The dedication of the memorial at a ceremony on August 14, 1842, marked the end of the Florida Indian Wars.

The Dade Monument was erected in 1845 at the United States Military Academy Cemetery to honor Major Dade and the men under his command killed in the Seminole War. 

Miami-Dade County, Florida (Dade County, until 1997); Dade County, Georgia; Dade County, Missouri; Dadeville, Alabama; and Dade City, Florida are all named after Major Dade. The now decommissioned fort on Egmont Key was also named for him. The battle is re-enacted at the Dade Battlefield Historic State Park each year. In 2002, the Dade County Courthouse was renamed the Major Francis Langhorne Dade County Courthouse by the Board of County Commissioners of Miami-Dade County. In the resolution changing the courthouse's name, the Board noted that it found "that Major Francis Langhorne Dade is a person who made a significant contribution to Miami-Dade County".

Notes

References
Dade's Last Command (1995) by Frank Laumer
John T. Kneebone et al., eds., Dictionary of Virginia Biography (Richmond: The Library of Virginia, 1998-   ), 3: 658–659.

External links
http://www.abfla.com/parks/DadeBattlefield/dadebattlefield.html
https://web.archive.org/web/20050831030840/http://www.cem.va.gov/nchp/staugustine.htm
http://sniff.numachi.com/~rickheit/dtrad/pages/tiDADEMASS.html

1793 births
1835 deaths
United States Army officers
Deaths by firearm in Florida
People from King George County, Virginia
American people of the Seminole Wars
American military personnel killed in the American Indian Wars
Seminole Wars